Petar Đorđić (born 17 September 1990) is a Serbian handball player who plays for S.L. Benfica and the Serbia national team.

His father, Zoran, is a former handball player who played for national team.

Honours
Benfica
EHF European League: 2021–22

References

Living people
1990 births
Sportspeople from Šabac
Serbian male handball players
HSG Wetzlar players
SG Flensburg-Handewitt players
S.L. Benfica handball players
Mediterranean Games gold medalists for Serbia
Competitors at the 2009 Mediterranean Games
Mediterranean Games medalists in handball
Expatriate handball players
Serbian expatriate sportspeople in Germany
Serbian expatriate sportspeople in Belarus
Serbian expatriate sportspeople in Portugal